Te Whiti may refer to:

 Te Whiti, New Zealand, a community in the Wairarapa region
 Te Whiti o Rongomai, a Māori spiritual leader